The name Ernesto has been used for seven tropical cyclones in the Atlantic Ocean. 
 Tropical Storm Ernesto (1982), formed southwest of Bermuda and dissipated without threatening land.
 Tropical Storm Ernesto (1988), formed east of Bermuda and did not cause any damage or casualties.
 Tropical Storm Ernesto (1994), formed southwest of Cape Verde and dissipated without affecting land.
 Tropical Storm Ernesto (2000), lasted for two days and did not threaten land.
 Hurricane Ernesto (2006), a Category 1 hurricane which formed near the Windward Islands, made landfall in Haiti and Cuba, struck Florida and the Carolinas, and killed at least 11 people.
 Hurricane Ernesto (2012), a Category 2 hurricane which made landfall in Mexico.
 Tropical Storm Ernesto (2018), formed in the North Atlantic and dissipated without affecting land.

Atlantic hurricane set index articles